St John's Street may refer to:

 St John's Street, Cambridge, England
 St. John's Street Railway Company. St. John's, Newfoundland

See also 
 St John Street (disambiguation)
 St John Baptist's Street, former name of Merton Street, Oxford, England

Odonyms referring to religion